The 2006 Gulf of Mexico earthquake occurred in the eastern Gulf of Mexico on September 10 at . The event was felt throughout much of the Gulf Coast of the United States and was the second earthquake of magnitude 5 or greater in the Gulf during 2006. Felt intensities, as measured on the Mercalli intensity scale, were as high as IV (Light) in Florida, with parts of Georgia at III (Weak).

Characteristics
The quake was reportedly felt along the gulf coast and as far north as Georgia. The earthquake was the strongest in the Gulf of Mexico in 33 years and was an intraplate earthquake, an event that takes place away from the borders of tectonic plates (where most tectonic activity takes place). Earthquakes in the Southeastern United States are not common, but several strong events have occurred in the region. In 1879 close to St. Augustine, Florida an earthquake damaged plaster and forced dishes off counters, and in South Carolina the 1886 Charleston earthquake caused severe damage and was responsible for the deaths of sixty people.

The event occurred near the Cuba Fracture Zone and was well away from the edge of the North American Plate. Randy Cox, an associate professor of earth science at the University of Memphis in Tennessee stated that the source of strain was the Mid-Atlantic Ridge, where seafloor spreading was causing compression of the North American Plate. A magnitude 5.2 event in February 2006 may have been associated with the same fault zone.

The epicenter of the earthquake was too far offshore for it to be well covered by onshore seismographs and the event's characteristics are therefore poorly constrained. The focal mechanism indicated reverse faulting. The focal depth of between 14–31 km show that it occurred within the seismogenic zone, rather than on any of the many shallow growth faults in the area. The earthquake led to a reassessment of the geohazard for hydrocarbon exploration and production facilities in the Gulf.

Several thousand people reported the event to the United States Geological Survey but none reported any damage from the 20 second earthquake. Items were knocked from shelves and seiches were observed in swimming pools in parts of Florida where felt intensities were reported as high as IV, including Brooksville on the west coast, Titusville on the east coast, and Panama City on the panhandle. In Atlanta, Georgia, the intensity was reported to be at level III.

See also
List of earthquakes in 2006
List of earthquakes in the United States

References

External links

Gulf of Mexico
2006 earthquakes
2006
2006
2006
2006 natural disasters in the United States
2006 in Florida
2006 in Louisiana
2006 in Alabama
September 2006 events in the United States